YbGaGe is an alloy of ytterbium, gallium and germanium. It sparked interest because one group of researchers reported that it exhibits zero thermal expansion, while being conductive. Such materials have applications in space and other environments where low thermal expansion materials are required. However, subsequent measurements by other groups were not able to reproduce those results, but rather found expansion coefficients similar to copper.

Nevertheless, YbGaGe does show anomalous thermal expansion. Near-zero thermal expansion was observed by Booth et al. It was found that near-zero thermal expansion (NZTE) in YbGaGe is sensitive to stoichiometry and defect concentration. However, the NZTE mechanism remains elusive

References

Artificial materials
Ytterbium compounds
Gallium alloys
Germanium compounds
Low thermal expansion materials